Aavarampoo is a 1992 Indian Tamil-language teen romance film, directed by Bharathan and produced by Keyaar. A remake of the 1980 Malayalam film Thakara, it stars Vineeth, Nandhini and Nassar. The film was released on 5 June 1992.

Plot 

Sakkarai  is a mentally ill boy and an orphan. Most of the villagers take advantage of his innocence. Sakkarai works under his chief Thevar, who has two wives. After a dispute with his first wife Lakshmi, he marries another woman. Sakkarai develops a soft corner for Thevar's daughter Thamarai. Aasari, who has been humiliated by Thamarai, brainwashes and manipulates Sakkarai. So Sakkarai has a physical relation with Thamarai. Later, Thevar finds out their relationship and beats the innocent Sakkarai. Later, Thevar arranges his daughter's marriage with Senkodan, a drunkard. What transpires later forms the crux of the story.

Cast 

Vineeth as Sakkarai
Nandhini as Thamarai
Nassar as Thevar
Goundamani as Aasari
Sulakshana as Thevar's second wife
Valsala Menon as Lakshmi, Thevar's first wife
Anu Anand as Balu
Bayilvan Ranganathan as Bayilvan
Sharmili as Pappa
Indrajith
Seena Antony
Vichithra
Master Deepak
Baby Sridevi
Bharathan in a cameo appearance

Soundtrack 
The soundtrack was composed by Ilaiyaraaja, with lyrics written by Pulamaipithan and Gangai Amaran.

Release and reception 
Aavarampoo was released on 12 June 1992. The Indian Express wrote, "the director's touch of class is evident in every frame". Marma Yogi of Kalki praised the film's short threaded story and lack of lengthy, unnecessary dialogues. For his performance, Nassar won the Tamil Nadu State Film Special Award for Best Actor.

References

External links 

1990s Tamil-language films
1992 films
Films directed by Bharathan
Films scored by Ilaiyaraaja
Indian teen romance films
Tamil remakes of Malayalam films